is the fifth studio album by Japanese idol duo Pink Lady, released through Victor Entertainment on December 1, 1979. The album contains two medleys, covers, and a Japanese version of their first American hit "Kiss in the Dark". Several of these covers were featured in the duo's U.S. variety show Pink Lady and Jeff.

The album peaked at No. 52 on Oricon's weekly albums chart and sold over 135,000 copies.

Track listing 
All music is arranged by Norio Maeda except "Kiss in the Dark" by Kazufumi Ohama.

Charts

References

External links
 
 
 

1979 albums
English-language Japanese albums
Japanese-language albums
Pink Lady (band) albums
Covers albums
Victor Entertainment albums